Cymindis pilosipennis is a species of ground beetle in the subfamily Harpalinae. It was described by Escalera in 1922.

References

pilosipennis
Beetles described in 1922